Sojib Hossain (born 1 January 1999) is a Bangladeshi cricketer. He made his List A debut for Uttara Sporting Club in the 2018–19 Dhaka Premier Division Cricket League on 8 March 2019.

References

External links
 

1999 births
Living people
Bangladeshi cricketers
Uttara Sporting Club cricketers
Place of birth missing (living people)